The Addams Family (Original Motion Picture Soundtrack) is the score album to the 2019 film of the same name directed by Conrad Vernon and Greg Tiernan based on the characters created by Charles Addams. The film's original music is composed by Mychael Danna and Jeff Danna, released by Lakeshore Records on October 11, 2019 alongside the film. The film also featured two songs: "My Family" recorded by Migos, Karol G, Snoop Dogg, and Rock Mafia, and "Haunted Heart" by Christina Aguilera released as singles on September 13 and 27, but not in the film's soundtrack. On January 24, 2020, the soundtrack was published in double vinyl by Enjoy The Ride Records and Mondo.

Background 
While scoring for the film, the Danna brothers imbibed the gypsy music, from France, Spain and Eastern Europe and blended them together. The gypsy music was used to interpret the Addams' "European roots" to access the history and dark humour of the family when they migrate to America. The combination of gyspy instrumentation and orchestral music, gave them "a tremendously colorful and lively pallette". Some of the instrumentation includes using Wurlitzer pipe, gothic organ and musical saw, that gives a "whimsical and gothic sounding". The duo also included Vic Mizzy's titular theme song from the 1964 television series into few bits in the film's score.

The titular track "Welcome to the Addams Family" was released as a single on October 4, 2019, along with the soundtrack's pre-order. Another single titled "Give My Creatures Life!" was released as a single on October 10, while the following day, the album was released in conjunction with the film.

In addition to the original score, the film also featured two songs. Migos, Karol G, Snoop Dogg, and Rock Mafia recorded the song "My Family" which was released as a single on September 13, 2019 by MGM Records. Christina Aguilera recorded the song "Haunted Heart" that was released as a September 27, 2019 by RCA Records. These two songs were however not featured in the soundtrack.

Track listing

Reception 
Filmtracks.com wrote "The gypsy and folk instrumentation is mildly obnoxious, and although the album does include the Mizzy song adaptation heard over the end credits, it is missing other notable songs heard on screen. It's a solid souvenir from this film, but seek out Shaiman's music from the live-action entries for a better concept listening experience."

Accolades 
Mychael and Jeff won the BMI Film & TV Awards in 2020, and also won two SOCAN Awards for Achievement in Feature Film Music and International Film Music Award in 2022. The track "Haunted Heart" received a nomination for the Best Original Song in an Animated Film at the 2019 Hollywood Music in Media Awards lost to "Beautiful Life" from Abominable (2019).

Release history

Personnel 
Credits adapted from CD liner notes.

 Music – Mychael Danna, Jeff Danna
 Additional music – Jessica Weiss, Nicholas Skalba
 Mixing – John Whynot
 Mastering – Justin Fleuriel, Stephen Marsh
 Score editor – Erich Stratmann
 Technician – Jamie Olivera
 Score coordinator – Shirley Song
 Music preparation – JoAnne Kane Music Service
 Scoring crew – Richard Wheeler Jr., Ryan Robinson
 Executive producer – Brian McNelis, Darren Blumenthal, Tara Finegan
 Art direction – John Bergin
 A&R – Eric Craig
 Instruments
 Accordion – Nick Ariondo
 Bass – Drew Dembowski, Ian Walker, Mike Valerio, Ed Meares
 Bassoon – Anthony Parnther, Rose Corrigan
 Cello – Cecilia Tsan, Charlie Tyler, Eric Byers, Jacob Braun, Mike Kaufman, Tim Loo, Vanessa Freebairn-Smith, Steve Erdody
 Clarinet – Don Foster, Stuart Clark
 Drums – Russ Miller
 Flute – Johanna Borenstein, Heather Clark
 French horn – Dan Kelley, Jenny Kim, Katie Faraudo, Mark Adams, Teag Reaves, Dylan Hart
 Harp – Katie Kirkpatrick
 Oboe – Lara Wickes, Leslie Reed
 Organ – Aaron Shows
 Recording assistance – Dimitri Smith, Harry Risoleo, Kyle Rodriguez
 Percussion – Bob Zimmitti, Brian Kilgore, Pete Korpela
 Piano – Mychael Danna
 Santoor – Hamid Saeidi
 Saw – Janeen Rae Heller
 Saxophones, woodwinds – George Shelby, Brian Scanlon, Dan Higgins, Greg Huckins, Jay Mason, Mike Nelson
 Tambura, bandurria, cuatro, tipple, cittern, ukulele, bouzouki, guitar – Jeff Danna
 Timpani – Wade Culbreath
 Trombone – Bill Reichenbach, Steve Holtman, Alex Iles
 Trumpet – Barry Perkins, Dan Fornero, Dusty McKinney, Rob Schaer, Jon Lewis, Wayne Bergeron
 Tuba – Doug Tornquist
 Viola – Alma Fernandez, Luke Maurer, Rob Brophy, Shawn Mann
 Violin – Alyssa Park, Andrew Bulbrook, Ben Jacobson, Charlie Bisharat, Jackie Brand, Jessica Guideri, Josefina Vergara, Lucia Micarelli, Marisa Kuney, Mark Robertson, Natalie Leggett, Neel Hammond, Sara Parkins, Shalini Vijayan, Songa Lee, Tammy Hatwan, Roger Wilkie
 Woodwind – Sandro Friedrich
 Orchestra
 Assistant orchestration – Brooks Ball
 Orchestration, conductor – Nicholas Dodd
 Contractor – Gina Zimmitti
 Assistant contractor – Whitney Martin
 Administrative coordinator – Don Smith, Erica Pope
 Concertmaster – Bruce Dukov
 Soloists and vocals
 Bass – Dave Stone
 Fiddle – Fabrice Martinez
 Percussion – Quinn
 Violin – Mark Robertson
 Soprano vocals – Holly Sedillos

References 

2019 soundtrack albums
The Addams Family music
Lakeshore Records soundtracks